Port-Daniel–Gascons is a municipality in the Gaspésie-Îles-de-la-Madeleine region of the province of Quebec in Canada.

The municipality includes the communities of Marcil, Clemville, Port-Daniel-Ouest, Port-Daniel-Est, Gascons-Ouest, and Gascons-Est. It was formed on January 17, 2001, through the merger of the Municipality of Port-Daniel and the Parish Municipality of Sainte-Germaine-de-l'Anse-aux-Gascons. Port-Daniel–Gascons is bordered to the south by Chaleur Bay, to the north by the interior of the Gaspésie, to the west by Shigawake, and to the east by Chandler (Newport District).

In 2017 McInnis Cement, the largest cement plant in the province of Quebec, was inaugurated in the Municipality of Port-Daniel–Gascons. The cement plant was constructed between 2014 and 2017. It will bring in $2.1 million annually in tax revenue.

The mayors of Port-Daniel–Gascons since 2001 are as follows: 
Maurice Anglehart (2001-2005) 
Henri Grenier (2005-2009) 
Maurice Anglehart (2009-2013) 
Henri Grenier (2013-2017)
Henri Grenier (2017-2021) 
On October 1, 2021, Henri Grenier was re-elected without opposition for a fourth (third consecutive) term as mayor (2021-2025). The Municipal election will be held on November 7, 2021.

Demographics

Population

Language

Transportation

The main road in town is Quebec Route 132.

VIA Rail ceased service to Port-Daniel station due to track closures and local bridge conditions in 2013. The station is located close to the city hall.

Notable natives
Édouard Gagnon (1918 – 2007), a Canadian Roman Catholic Cardinal
Hazel McCallion (1921 – 2023), former mayor of Mississauga, Ontario

See also
 List of municipalities in Quebec

References 

Incorporated places in Gaspésie–Îles-de-la-Madeleine
Municipalities in Quebec